This is a list of stadiums in the Faroe Islands.

Current stadiums 

Football venues in the Faroe Islands
Football stadiums
Football stadiums
Football stadiums, Faroe